Bathylaco is a genus of slickheads found in deep oceanic waters. It is one of nineteen genera in the family Alepocephalidae.

Species
There are currently three recognized species in this genus:
 Bathylaco macrophthalmus J. G. Nielsen & Larsen, 1968
 Bathylaco nielseni Sazonov & Ivanov, 1980
 Bathylaco nigricans Goode & T. H. Bean, 1896 (Black warrior)

References

Alepocephalidae
Ray-finned fish genera
Marine fish genera
Taxa named by George Brown Goode
Taxa named by Tarleton Hoffman Bean